Sweet Sweet Music is a live album by the late Scottish folk musician Bert Jansch, released on 13 February 2012. This album is amongst the last of his live recordings.

Track listing
All tracks composed by Bert Jansch; except where indicated

"It Don't Bother Me"
"Strolling Down the Highway"
"Blackwaterside"
"My Pocket's Empty Baby"
"Fresh as a Sweet Sunday Morning"
"Rosemary Lane"
"Blues Run the Game" (Jackson C. Frank)
"Courting Blues"
"Reynardine"
"Poison"
"October Song" (Robin Williamson)
"Hey Pretty Girl"

References

2012 live albums
Bert Jansch albums
Secret Records live albums